Anja Nyffeler (born 25 November 1992) is a Swiss competitor in synchronized swimming who competed in the 2011 World Aquatics Championships, 2013 World Aquatics Championships, and 2012 Summer Olympics.

References 

1992 births
Living people
Swiss synchronized swimmers
Olympic synchronized swimmers of Switzerland
Synchronized swimmers at the 2012 Summer Olympics